David Vincent Stratton (October 14, 1884 – February 25, 1968) was an industrial engineer. He was vice president of the Great Lakes Aircraft Company in 1930 and in 1931 was president of the Johnson Motor Company. He made important contributions to shipbuilding in the United States by the development of time and motion study.

Biography
He was born on October 14, 1884, in Altoona, South Dakota, now part of Hitchcock, South Dakota.

In 1908 he was the chief clerk to the division engineer in charge of La Boca Dredging Division of the Panama Canal.

By 1924 he was president of New York Harbor Dry Dock, replacing George C. Clark.

In 1930 he was vice president of the Great Lakes Aircraft Corporation.

In 1931 he was president of the Johnson Motor Company in Waukegan, Illinois.

By 1942 he was working as an independent consultant.

In 1944 he was working for the Merco - Nordstrom Valve Company in Oakland, California.

He died on February 25, 1968, in Sacramento, California.

Footnotes

1884 births
1968 deaths
People from Beadle County, South Dakota
American industrial engineers